Mount Sunapee State Park is a public recreation area in Newbury, New Hampshire. The state park's nearly  include most of Mount Sunapee and a beach area on Lake Sunapee. Park activities include swimming, hiking, camping, skiing, fishing, picnicking, and non-motorized boating. The park's ski area is operated as Mount Sunapee Resort under the management of Vail Resorts Inc.

The park's beach, also known as Newbury Beach, features a bathhouse, store, canoe and kayak rentals, playground, and restricted boat launch. A seasonal campground is located off NH Route 103, up a winding mountain road accessed through Mount Sunapee Resort.

Greenways
The  Monadnock-Sunapee Greenway links the park to Pillsbury State Park and southern New Hampshire. 

The Sunapee-Ragged-Kearsarge Greenway, a  loop trail (the "emerald necklace") links the park to Wadleigh State Park, Winslow State Park, and Rollins State Park as well as Gile, Kearsarge and Shadow Hill state forests and the Bog Mountain Wildlife Management Area.

Trails
The state park's extensive trail system is used in all seasons for hiking and in winter for snowshoeing.

From the ski area parking, the Summit Trail travels  along the western slope to the summit, where it meets the Solitude Trail for a  walk to Lake Solitude and White Ledges. The Solitude Trail then links to several trails, notably the popular Andrew Brook Trail and the steeper Newbury Trail, both heading eastward, and to the M-S Greenway as it heads south along Sunapee Mountain toward Pillsbury State Park.

References

External links
Mount Sunapee State Park New Hampshire Department of Natural and Cultural Resources
Mount Sunapee State Park Trail Map New Hampshire Department of Natural and Cultural Resources

State parks of New Hampshire
Parks in Merrimack County, New Hampshire
Newbury, New Hampshire
Beaches of New Hampshire
Protected areas established in 1948
1948 establishments in New Hampshire